Hugues C. Pernath (pseudonym of Hugo Wouters, 15 August 1931 in Borgerhout – 4 June 1975 in Borgerhout) was a Belgian writer. Together with Paul Snoek, he founded the avant garde magazine Gard Sivik, and he was a member of the Pink Poets. The literary award Hugues C. Pernath-prijs is named after him.

Bibliography
 Het uur Marat (1958)
 De adem ik (1960)
 Het masker man (1960)
 Soldatenbrieven (1961)
 Hedendaags (1963)
 Instrumentarium voor een winter (1963)
 Mijn gegeven woord (1966)
 De acht hoofdzonden (1970)
 Exodus (1970)
 Mijn tegenstem (1973)

Awards
 1961 - Arkprijs van het Vrije Woord
 1968 - Poëzie-prijs van de provincie Antwerpen
 1977 - Driejaarlijkse Staatsprijs voor Poëzie

Sources
 Hugues C. Pernath
 Fernand Auwera, ‘Hugues C. Pernath’ In: Schrijven of schieten. Interviews (1969)

1931 births
1975 deaths
Flemish writers
Ark Prize of the Free Word winners
People from Borgerhout